Denise Stiff is a manager of contemporary musicians.  She was the long-time manager of Alison Krauss and was Gillian Welch's manager.  She also served as Executive Music Producer for the 2000 film O Brother, Where Art Thou.

References

Living people
Appalachian State University alumni
University of South Carolina alumni
Year of birth missing (living people)